Salem Hospital may refer to:

Salem Hospital (Massachusetts)
Salem Hospital (Oregon)